Zupančič is the 5th most frequent surname in Slovenia, and may refer to:

 Alenka Zupančič (born 1966), Slovenian philosopher
 Boštjan Zupančič (born 1947), Slovenian lawyer, a justice of the European Court of Human Rights
 Milena Zupančič, Slovenian actor
 Rihard Zupančič, Slovenian mathematician

Variant Župančič:
 Oton Župančič (1878–1949), Slovenian poet

References